The November 1960 Peru earthquake occurred offshore northern Peru on November 20 at . The magnitude of the earthquake was  6.75 by using the conventional surface-wave magnitude measurement within a shorter duration of ~20 s. The discrepancy was caused from the earthquake's long source duration of about 130 s, and by calculating the seismic moment, the magnitude would be  7.6 or  7.8, according to different sources. This earthquake belongs to a category of earthquakes with slow rupture velocities and potential of producing tsunamis larger than those expected from the moment magnitudes.

The tsunami caused damage along the coast of the Lambayeque Department. Three deaths were reported in Lambayeque Department. Thirteen deaths and 50 missing were reported in the Guañape Islands, La Libertad Department. The tsunami was also observed in Hilo, Hawaii.

See also
List of earthquakes in 1960
List of earthquakes in Peru

References 

Peru
Peru
1960 in Peru
November 1960 events in South America
Tsunami earthquakes
Earthquakes in Peru
Tsunamis in Peru
1960 disasters in Peru